The 1902 Copa de la Coronación Final was the final of the Copa de la Coronación, the Spanish football cup competition. The match took place on 15 May 1902 at the Hipódromo in Madrid. The match was contested by Club Bizcaya and FC Barcelona, and it was refereed by Carlos Padrós.

Club Bizcaya lifted the trophy for the first time with a 2–1 victory over FC Barcelona. Bizcaya's captain and president Juan Astorquia netted the opening goal early in the first half and they doubled their lead a few minutes later thanks to Raymond Cazeaux. Barcelona only responded in the second half with a goal from John Parsons, but it was not enough to prevent Bizcaya from winning the tournament.

Match details 

|}

See also
Athletic–Barcelona clásico

References

External links
RSSSF.com

1902
1901–02 in Spanish football
FC Barcelona matches
Club Bizcaya matches